Barys Hrynkevich (born April 26, 1981 in Grodno) is a retired amateur Belarusian freestyle wrestler, who competed in the men's super heavyweight category. He finished seventh in the 120-kg division at the 2003 World Wrestling Championships in New York City, New York, United States, and later represented his nation Belarus at the 2004 Summer Olympics. Hrynkevich also trained as a member of the freestyle wrestling team for RTsFVS Hrodna, under his personal coach Aleh Harbuz.

Hrynkevich qualified for the Belarusian squad in the men's super heavyweight class (120 kg) at the 2004 Summer Olympics in Athens, by placing seventh and receiving a berth from the World Championships a year earlier. Hrynkevich suffered three straight defeats from Mongolia's Gelegjamtsyn Ösökhbayar (0–6), Bulgaria's Bozhidar Boyadzhiev (1–5), and Iran's Alireza Rezaei (0–7), who later clinched a silver medal at the end of the tournament, with only a single point earned in the prelim pool, finishing seventeenth overall in the final standings.

References

External links
Profile – International Wrestling Database

1981 births
Living people
Belarusian male sport wrestlers
Olympic wrestlers of Belarus
Wrestlers at the 2004 Summer Olympics
Sportspeople from Grodno
21st-century Belarusian people
20th-century Belarusian people